Chronometers were formerly used for the accurate determination of longitude by ships at sea.  By measuring the time of local solar noon compared to the time of noon at a reference point the difference in longitude can be directly found.  For this system to work, a timepiece showing the time at the reference point must be carried to the measuring point.  A timepiece intended to remain accurate while subjected to the motions of a ship at sea and through extreme changes in environment, especially temperature, is called a chronometer.  These were first built in the 18th century and were used extensively by mariners in the 19th century and into the 20th century, even after the widespread use of radio for time signals – the time signal was used to set the chronometer, but the instrument was still necessary to display the time.

HMS Beagle was an Admiralty survey ship sent on three major expeditions.  The first (1826–1830) was to survey the coast of South America in company with HMS Adventure.  The second expedition (1831–1836) was to build on the work of the first in South America and then to go onward to establish a chain of linked reference points encircling the globe. The third expedition (1837–1843) surveyed the coast of Australia.

A chronometer was first carried on a survey ship by James Cook on his second voyage in 1772.  This was Larcum Kendall's K1, a copy of John Harrison's H4, the first practical chronometer. From 1818 the Admiralty began issuing chronometers to naval ships.  From 1825, this became standard and ships were issued a second chronometer if the captain personally provided a third. Three chronometers was the minimum necessary to be able to identify whether one had become unacceptably inaccurate.  By the time of the Beagle voyages, the use of marine chronometers had become routine and the ship carried a large number – an unprecedented 22 on the second voyage.  This had become possible because the price of chronometers had decreased steadily as manufacturing increased.  H4 had cost over £20,000 (inflation adjusted £) to develop.  Kendall's K1 cost £500 (now £) and his cheap model, K3, cost £100 (now £), but by the time the Beagle voyages were over the cost of a good chronometer had fallen to under £40 (now £).

Beagle required large numbers of chronometers because some would inevitably break down on long voyages and the chronometers were essential for the mission of the ship. Further, the rates of all chronometers vary with time. Although this can be allowed for by interpolating between the regular rate checks, there is no guarantee that the changes are linear, and often they are not. Averaging the readings from a large number of chronometers, especially if they are of a variety of types, will tend to cancel out such errors.

To reach all points designated by the Admiralty for longitude measurements, it was sometimes necessary to take chronometers ashore, across inlets and up rivers too shallow for the ship. This put the chronometers at risk and the disturbance of moving them affected their accuracy. This was another reason for survey ships to carry a large number – most of them could be kept permanently in a safe, well-cushioned place on the main vessel.

Chronometer makers
Some details of the chronometer makers referred to in the lists below are given in this table.  With few exceptions, they were London-based makers.

Nomenclature
In the following lists, the designation letter ("Des." column) is a reference assigned to the chronometer while it was on board ship and was used to identify the instrument in logged tables of chronometer readings during the voyage. It was a temporary designation with no relevance once the ship's mission was over. The number ("No." column) was a number permanently marked on it by the maker and together with the maker's name uniquely identified the instrument. When referring to chronometers, the maker's name is frequently abbreviated; for instance, Earnshaw's chronometer no. 509 is known simply as E509. The "type" of all chronometers listed here is either box or pocket. A boxed chronometer is mounted on gimbals attached to its box. A pocket chronometer is in the style of a pocketwatch. "Winding" refers to the number of days that a chronometer kept going before needing rewinding. However, they were all wound at precisely the same time every day, except for the eight-day chronometers which were wound weekly.

First voyage
On its first voyage (1826–1830), the Beagle accompanied the Adventure, which led the expedition under the command of Phillip Parker King.  The Beagle was initially commanded by Pringle Stokes, but Stokes became depressed and shot himself on 1 August 1828 while the expedition was at Port Famine. He died 12 days later. After a brief temporary command by Lieutenant Skyring, Robert Fitz-Roy, future first head of the Met Office, was appointed the new commander of Beagle.

Beagle carried only three chronometers on this expedition; the majority of the expedition's chronometers were on board Adventure (see next section).

Adventure's chronometers

As the lead ship, the Adventure carried the majority of the expedition's chronometers during the Beagles first expedition. They are included here for completeness.

King both commanded the Adventure and led the expedition.  His mission was to chart the coast of South America from the southern shore of the Río de la Plata to Tierra del Fuego. King was also ordered to use his chronometers to accurately determine the longitude of several points, mostly Atlantic islands, on the outward journey to South America. These included Madeira, Tenerife, the Cape Verde islands, and Rio de Janeiro.

Chronometers A to H were new and King showed concern that they had not yet properly settled to a steady rate.  It was the custom for Navy chronometers to be run for six months or so at the Greenwich Observatory and the rate checked before issuing to a ship.  It was well known that new chronometers typically took six months to settle to a steady rate.

Chronometer Z and the two boxes containing chronometers A to D and E to H respectively were fixed in a chest and secured to the deck as low down as practicable in the centre of the ship. This placed them near the ship's centre of motion which minimised movement. Fixing them in one place also ensured that the magnetic influence of the ship on the chronometers remained fixed and that the effect this had on the chronometer's rates stayed constant. Since the rates were regularly checked and variations allowed for in the calculations, the magnetic effect of the ship was automatically taken into account.

Murray 553 had been on trial at the Greenwich Observatory for several months and had performed well. It was a welcome addition given King's concern over the newness of the French chronometers. Parkinson & Frodsham 1048 was lent to King by the makers for trial during the voyage.  However, its manufacture was only completed two days before the Adventure set sail, leaving no time to check and settle the rate. The French pocket chronometer was another loan, this time from the maker of the main batch of government chronometers. It was used by King as a journeyman watch, transferring readings to and from the place of measurement, which allowed the principal chronometers to be left undisturbed.

Second voyage

The second voyage of the Beagle was commanded by Fitz-Roy and lasted from 1831 to 1836. The mission given to Fitz-Roy was two-fold. Firstly, he was to continue the survey work of South America by King on the first voyage and extend it through Tierra del Fuego around to the coast of Chile on the west side of the continent. Secondly, he was to establish a chain of reference points with known longitudes that could be used by future mariners to accurately set their chronometers. This was also the voyage that carried Charles Darwin.  Fitz-Roy was given a detailed list of objectives by the Admiralty Hydrographer's office. The first part of the journey more or less repeated King's, partly to check King's results, but also to break the journey into small sections so that the chronometers could be rated over four days at each stop and changes in temperature between references would not affect them too severely.

Beagle was not allowed to land at Tenerife through fears that those aboard would bring cholera, but the ship proceeded to Cape Verde, Fernando de Noronha and Rio de Janeiro. She then spent some time surveying the coast of South America south from Rio de Janeiro, around Tierra del Fuego, the coast of Chile and as far north as Peru. Fitz-Roy finally detached Beagle from South America in August 1835. The Admiralty had not precisely specified his itinerary across the Pacific since they could not be sure how far north he would be able to survey in the time available, and hence precisely where he would be leaving from. But they did specify that he should stop at Tahiti, a point of previously well-determined longitude. The Admiralty also required that, like the journey across the Atlantic, it should be done in small stages to frequently rate the chronometers. Fitz-Roy chose to go via the Galápagos Islands. Subsequently Beagle visited Tahiti, New Zealand, Australia and Mauritius.

Using chronometers, the crew of Beagle succeeded in providing a chain of longitude distances that completely circled the globe for the first time. The sum of the differences in local noon between each location should have amounted to 24 hours since the Beagle completed a circumnavigation of the globe. The total discrepancy was only 33 seconds but Fitz-Roy considered this too large to be explained by chronometer inaccuracy alone and none of his results disagreed excessively with earlier surveys.  He suggested that sailing mostly in the same direction relative to the Earth's magnetic field was having a small unexplained effect on the chronometers.  Nevertheless, an error equivalent to only  on a five-year voyage over tens of thousands of miles was a remarkable achievement.

Each of Beagle's chronometers was contained in its own box, suspended on gimbals.  These boxes were planted into a thick bed of sawdust laid in partitioned shelves, like open-top boxes, one partition for each chronometer.  The whole assembly was placed in a small, dedicated cabin low down in the ship as near as possible to the ship's centre of motion. Most of the chronometers remained in this cabin throughout the entire trip.  Not all of the chronometers were provided by the Government; some were owned personally by Fitz-Roy and one was lent by Lord Ashburnham. Others were lent by chronometer makers, who were keen to gain the prestige of having had instruments aboard major, well-publicised expeditions.

No one was allowed in the chronometer cabin except when it was necessary to read or maintain them. Fitz-Roy employed an instrument maker, George James Stebbing, to look after the chronometers and ensure they were regularly and properly wound. Fitz-Roy paid Stebbing himself since the Admiralty had declined to do so and Fitz-Roy considered the function essential.  The Admiralty conceded that Stebbing could be fed from the ship's stores – a favour not extended to Darwin who paid £500 (inflation adjusted £) for his keep.

Attrition
Beagle left with 22 chronometers, but returned to Devonport with only 11 still in working order. Four had been left in Peru with Beagle's Master's Assistant, Alexander Burns Usborne, who had been put in charge of a small boat, Constitución, to continue the survey of the coast of Peru. The mainspring of chronometer R had broken and several others had stopped. The 11 still in use were A, B, C, D, G, H, L, N, O, S and Z.

A chronometer was damaged as Beagle was approaching Cape Horn on 13 January 1833. The ship was hit by three enormous rolling waves in quick succession. The first wave slowed the ship sufficiently that she could no longer make way and the second turned her broadside to the third.  This last wave rolled the ship so far that the bulwark on the opposite side went  under water.  This was a critical moment for Beagle; many of her class had been lost through capsizing.

Third voyage

The third voyage of Beagle, under the command of John Clements Wickham, began in 1837 with a mission to chart the west coast of Australia between the Fitzroy River and the Swan River, and the Bass Strait – the channel separating mainland Australia from Tasmania.  In 1839 Beagle was taken north to explore the Arafura Sea where Port Darwin was discovered and named. The voyage is also notable for the watercolour paintings of fish and other wildlife produced by 1st Lt. James Barker Emery.  In March 1841 Wickham gave up command due to illness and returned to England. Command was then given to John Lort Stokes.

Other than mentioning that he carried a pocket chronometer by French which gave good results, Stokes' account of the voyage does not list or even enumerate the chronometers.Stokes, chapt. 2.3  It may be that chronometers were now so commonplace that their use was no longer something of note.  However it is quite clear that the chronometers remained a key part of the mission; frequent stops were made throughout the voyage to check the rates. On 7 December 1839 Stokes went ashore at Point Pearce near the mouth of Victoria River to make observations. Even though he knew the indigenous Australians could be dangerous, he left behind his gun to more safely carry a chronometer.  While separated, Stokes was pursued by a group of Australians, one of whom pierced Stokes' chest cavity with a spear throw. Despite his wounds and profuse bleeding, Stokes considered the chronometer to be valuable enough to save; he carried it while he staggered back to his comrades barely able to walk and still being pursued by his attackers.

Notes

References

Bibliography
Anderson, Katharine, Predicting the Weather: Victorians and the Science of Meteorology, Chicago: University of Chicago Press, 2005 .
Britten, Frederick James, Old Clocks and Watches & Their Makers, London: E. & N. Spon Limited, 1922 .
Chamberlain, Paul Mellen, It's About Time, New York: Richard R. Smith, 1941 .
Darwin, Charles The Origin of Species and the Voyage of the Beagle, New York: Alfred A. Knopf 2003 .
Delgado, James P., Across the Top of the World: the Quest for the Northwest Passage, Vancouver: Douglas & McIntyre, 1999 .
Fisher, Robin; Johnston, Hugh J. M., From maps to metaphors: the Pacific world of George Vancouver, Vancouver: UBC Press, 1993 .
Fitz-Roy, Robert, Narrative of the Surveying Voyages of His Majesty's Ships Adventure and Beagle, Between the Years 1826 and 1836, Volume 2 (1831–1836), London: Henry Colburn, 1839 .
Fitz-Roy, Robert; King, Phillip Parker, "Remarks on the chronometrical observations made during the surveying voyages of H. M. Ships Adventure and Beagle, between the years 1826 and 1836", Appendix to Volume 2, pp. 318–345.
Gould, Rupert T., The Marine Chronometer, London: Holland Press 1960 
Haycox, Stephen W.; Barnett, James; Liburd, Caedmon, Enlightenment and Exploration in the North Pacific, 1741–1805, Seattle: University of Washington Press, 1997 .
King, Phillip Parker, Narrative of the Surveying Voyages of His Majesty's Ships Adventure and Beagle, Between the Years 1826 and 1836, Volume 1 (1826–1830), London: Henry Colburn, 1839 .
Leahy, Frank, "William John Wills as scientist", McCann, D. A.; Joyce,  E. B. (eds), Burke and Wills: The Scientific Legacy of the Victorian Exploring Expedition, pp. 23–57, Australia: Csiro Publishing, 2011 .
Macdonald, Fiona, Inside the Beagle with Charles Darwin, Brighton: Salariya Publishers, 2005 .
Nicholas, F. W.; Nicholas, Janice Mary, Charles Darwin in Australia, Cambridge: Cambridge University Press, 2002 .
Pipon, John H., "Narrative of the survey, by the British Commission, of the boundary between the British possessions in North America and the United States of America, under the Treaty of Washington of the 9th of August 1842", Corps Papers and Memoirs on Military Subjects, The Royal Engineers and East India Company's Engineers, vol. 1''', no. 2, pp. 107–169, London: John Weale 1849 .
Robson, William, Robson's London Directory, Street Key, Classification of Trades, and Royal Court Guide and Peerage, London: Robson and Co., 1842 .
Rubin, Jeff, Antarctica, London: Lonely Planet, 2008 .
Stokes, John Lort, Discoveries in Australia; With an Account of the Coasts and Rivers Explored and Surveyed During The Voyage of H.M.S. Beagle, in the Years 1837-38-39-40-41-42-43, Volume 1, Volume 2, London: T. and W. Boone 1846 .
Taylor, James, The Voyage of the Beagle: Darwin's Extraordinary Adventure in Fitzroy's Famous Survey Ship, London: Anova Books, 2008 .
Thompson, Julian, Imperial War Museum Book of the War at Sea 1914–18, London: Pan Macmillan, 2011 .
Williams, Nat; Dent, Margaret, National Treasures from Australia's Great Libraries'', Canberra: National Library Australia, 2005 .

Exploration of Australia
Exploration of South America
HMS Beagle
Horology
Individual clocks